Mizque Airport  is an airport  west-northwest of Mizque in the Cochabamba Department of Bolivia.

The runway is on a shallow alluvial fan, with the mountainous terrain of Bolivia's Cordillera Real in all quadrants.

See also

Transport in Bolivia
List of airports in Bolivia

References

External links 
OpenStreetMap - Mizque Airport
OurAirports - Mizque Airport
FallingRain - Mizque Airport

Airports in Cochabamba Department